Jade Kyle Stighling (born 27 May 1993) is a South African professional rugby union player for the  in Super Rugby, the  in the Currie Cup and the  in the Rugby Challenge. He usually plays as a left or right winger and occasionally as an outside centre.

Rugby career

Schoolboy rugby

Stighling was born in Johannesburg and went to Primary school in Crystal Park Primary nearby Benoni with co-athletes Shaun Motubatse and Kevin Madlala.

Blue Bulls

After high school, Stighling moved to Pretoria to join the  academy. Stighling played off the bench in their 46–35 victory over the  team in the semi-finals and started the final, where his side lost 18–22 to Western Province in Durban.

He made eight starts and one appearance as a replacement for the  team in the 2013 Under-21 Provincial Championship. He scored tries against Border and the Free State during the regular season as his team won eight of their twelve of their matches, but didn't feature in the title play-offs, as the Blue Bulls reached the final before being beaten by Western Province.

He made seven starts for the university team and scored one try against Gauteng rivals . He scored further tries against the golden Lions, Leopards and Western Province as his team finished in second place to qualify for the title play-offs. He started both their 23–19 victory over the Golden Lions in the semi-final and the final, where his side got the better of Western Province, winning 20–10 in Cape Town.

Stighling was a key player for the Blue Bulls in the 2016 Currie Cup qualification competition, starting thirteen of their fourteen matches.

Stighling was included in the Blue Bulls squad for the 2016 Currie Cup Premier Division and named in the starting line-up for their opening match of the competition against . In addition to making his Currie Cup debut, he also scored a try in the 47th minute of the match to help the Blue Bulls to a 45–26 win.

References

South African rugby union players
Living people
1993 births
Rugby union players from Johannesburg
Rugby union centres
Rugby union wings
Blue Bulls players
Bulls (rugby union) players
Pumas (Currie Cup) players